Benoît Beaumet (born 22 September 1967) is a French former professional footballer who played as a defender.

References

1967 births
Living people
Sportspeople from Blois
French footballers
Association football defenders
Chamois Niortais F.C. players
Paris FC players
INF Clairefontaine players
Ligue 2 players
CO Saint-Dizier players
INF Vichy players
Footballers from Centre-Val de Loire